Lanḍī Kōtal or Lwargai ( Lwāṛgai) is a town in the Khyber Pakhtunkhwa province of Pakistan, and the administrative capital of Khyber District. Landi Kotal is at the western edge of the Khyber Pass that marks the entrance to the Nangarhar Province of Afghanistan, which is located just  to the west.

Landi Kotal is a tourist destination. It was the terminus railway station of Khyber Pass Railway. A tourist train, the Khyber train safari was run on this railway. However, the train was closed down in 2006 due to washing away of the railway track and bridges by flood.

Landi Kotal is the main shopping centre for the Shalmani, Shinwari, Afridi, and Mulagori tribes of Khyber Agency.

History

Landi Kotal was the westernmost part of the Khyber held by the British during their rule of the Indian subcontinent. In 1897 the Afridis attacked Landi Kotal and other posts in the Khyber Pass.  Although the Khyber Rifles put up a stiff defence, Landi Kotal was overrun, as the Rifles lacked water. The British counter-attacked with a force of 34,500 men under Sir William Lockhart, defeating the Afridis, although the Afridis took the town again during the second Anglo-Afghan War.

The Landi Kotal fort during the period of British rule was of the ordinary type, consisting of a keep and an outer fort with accommodation for 5 British officers and 500 native officers and men. From 1899, like the other posts in the Khyber, it had been garrisoned by the Khyber Rifles, an irregular corps of militia recruited from the tribes of the Khyber Agency.

In 1925 the heavily engineered Khyber Pass Railway was opened linking Jamrud to the Landi Kotal.

Notable people
Hamza Shinwari
Shaheen Afridi
Usman Khan Shinwari
Khatir Afridi
Ayub Afridi

See also

References

==External links==

{Landi Kotal railway station}
{}
Populated places in Khyber District